Spiker is a surname. Notable people with the surname include:

Zach Spiker (born 1976), American college basketball coach
John Spiker (born 1981), American musician
Olivia Spiker (born 1981), Polish-German female amateur boxer
A. J. Spiker (born 1979), Chairman of the Republican Party of Iowa